Zheng'an County is a county in the north of Guizhou province, China, bordering Chongqing to the north. It is under the administration of the prefecture-level city of Zunyi.

Climate

References

 
County-level divisions of Guizhou
Zunyi